Deputy Director-General is a job title used in many organizations around the world, and is a deputy for a director-general.

It may refer to:
 Soumya Swaminathan, a Deputy Director-General of the World Health Organization
 Jane Ellison, a Deputy Director-General of the World Health Organization
 Yonov Frederick Agah, a Deputy Director-General of the World Trade Organization
 Karl Brauner, a Deputy Director-General of the World Trade Organization
 Alan Wolff, a Deputy Director-General of the World Trade Organization
 Yi Xiaozhun, a Deputy Director-General of the World Trade Organization
Binying Wang, a Deputy Director-General of the World Intellectual Property Organization

See also
Director General
Director (disambiguation)